Orcas Village (sometimes just called Orcas or Orcas Landing) is an unincorporated community located at southeastern corner of the West Sound watershed on Orcas Island in San Juan County, Washington, United States. It is where the Washington State Ferry lands on the island, and consequently handles all vehicular traffic to and from the island.

While the island can also be accessed by Orcas Island Airport or by private boats, the ferry connection means that most people enter and leave the island through this small village, which consequently has restaurants, small grocery, and gift shops. It is home to the Orcas Hotel—built 1904 and listed on the National Register of Historic Places since 1982—and also has a small public dock, a private marina, and parking for islanders who commute off-island by ferry. It is designated as an activity center under San Juan County's comprehensive plan.

References

External links

 
 Orcas Village Planning, San Juan County Community Development and Planning Department—Long-Range Planning, includes links to several detailed maps and planning documents.

Unincorporated communities in Washington (state)
Unincorporated communities in San Juan County, Washington